The Utah Grizzlies were an ice hockey team in the International Hockey League (IHL) and American Hockey League (AHL). They originally played at the Delta Center in Salt Lake City, before relocating to the E Center in the Salt Lake City suburb of West Valley City in 1997. After the 2004–05 season, the franchise was suspended. It was sold in 2006 and moved to Cleveland where it returned to play in 2007 as the Lake Erie Monsters. A new Utah Grizzlies franchise in the ECHL began play in 2005.

History
The original Utah Grizzlies moved to Utah in 1995 after one IHL season in Denver, Colorado, as the NHL's Quebec Nordiques relocated to Denver to become the Colorado Avalanche. The Grizzlies were admitted to the AHL in 2001 after the IHL folded. They played their home games in the Delta Center until the E Center was built a couple seasons after their arrival in Salt Lake.

While in Denver, the Grizzlies won the 1994–95 Turner Cup, the championship of the IHL. After relocating to the Salt Lake City area, the Utah Grizzlies once again marched to victory in the IHL playoffs. Utah swept the Orlando Solar Bears in four games to win the 1995–96 Turner Cup. The fourth (and final) game of the series was played in the Delta Center; 17,381 fans attended, which, at the time, set a national record for largest attendance at a minor league ice hockey game.

The franchise was granted a voluntary suspension for the 2005–06 season, and on May 16, 2006, it was sold to an ownership group from Cleveland led by Dan Gilbert, the owner of the Cleveland Cavaliers and Quicken Loans. The franchise was moved to Cleveland to replace the departed Cleveland Barons and resumed play in 2007 as the Lake Erie Monsters.

After the suspension of the IHL/AHL Grizzlies, a new ownership group purchased the Utah Grizzlies identity and resurrected a team of the same name in the ECHL that started playing in the 2005–06 season.

Market facts
The Salt Lake City market was previously served by:
Salt Lake Golden Eagles of the WHL (1969–74)
Salt Lake Golden Eagles of the CHL (1974–84)
Salt Lake Golden Eagles of the IHL (1984–94)

The franchise was replaced by:
Utah Grizzlies of the ECHL (2005–present)

Affiliates
New York Islanders (1995–98)
Dallas Stars (2000–04)
Phoenix Coyotes (2004–05)

Season-by-season results
 Denver Grizzlies 1994–95 (International Hockey League)
 Utah Grizzlies 1995–2001 (International Hockey League)
 Utah Grizzlies 2001–05 (American Hockey League)

Team records

Single season
Goals: 46  Kip Miller (1994–95)
Assists: 60  Kip Miller (1994–95)
Points: 106  Kip Miller (1994–95)
Penalty minutes: 317  Mike MacWilliam  (1995–96)
GAA: 2.21  Rich Parent (1999–00)
SV%: .928  Wade Flaherty (2001–02)
Wins: 45  Tommy Salo (1994–95)
Shutouts: 5   Mike Bales (2000–01)

Goaltending records need a minimum 25 games played by the goaltender

Career
Career goals: 111  Chris Taylor (1994–98)
Career assists: 167  Chris Taylor
Career points: 278  Chris Taylor
Career penalty minutes: 694 John Erskine (2000–03)
Career goaltending wins: 73  Tommy Salo  (1994–96)
Career shutouts: 7  Tommy Salo
Career games: 440  Gord Dineen  (1994–2000)

References

External links
The Internet Hockey Database - Utah Grizzlies

 
Ice hockey teams in Utah
Ice hockey clubs established in 1995
Ice hockey clubs disestablished in 2005
New York Islanders minor league affiliates
Dallas Stars minor league affiliates
Arizona Coyotes minor league affiliates
1995 establishments in Utah
2005 disestablishments in Utah